I Walk the Line is the nineteenth studio album by singer and songwriter Johnny Cash, featuring a handful of recent songs alongside new recordings of previous hits throughout his career up to that point. It was released on Columbia Records in 1964. The album was certified Gold by the RIAA in 1967.

Track listing

Personnel

 Johnny Cash – vocals, guitar
 Luther Perkins - lead guitar
 Norman Blake - acoustic guitar, dobro
 Bob Johnson, Jack Clement - rhythm guitar
 Marshall Grant - bass
 W.S. Holland - drums
 Bill Pursell - piano
 Don Helms - steel guitar
 Karl Garvin, Bill McElhiney - trumpet
 Rufus Long - flute
 The Carter Family - backing vocals

Additional personnel
Produced by: Don Law and Frank Jones
Cover Photo by: Lee Friedlander

Charts

Album - Billboard (United States)

Singles - Billboard (United States)

Certifications

References

External links
 Luma Electronic entry on I Walk the Line

I Walk the Line
I Walk the Line
I Walk the Line